Jennifer Elaine Alley is a former basketball coach. She served as head coach of the University of North Carolina at Chapel Hill women's basketball team from 1977 to 1986.

Alley was the first full-time head coach of the Tar Heels' women's program, and her tenure included a conference championship in 1984.

Awards and honors
 1984 – ACC Women's Basketball Champions

References

Year of birth missing (living people)
Place of birth missing (living people)
Living people
Sportspeople from North Carolina
University of North Carolina at Chapel Hill faculty
American women's basketball coaches
High Point Panthers women's basketball coaches
University of North Carolina at Wilmington faculty
North Carolina Tar Heels women's basketball coaches